Vardin or Verdin may refer to:

Places
 Vardin, Ahar
 Vardin, Varzaqan

People
 Alexandre Vardin, a French footballer
 Ilya Vardin, Bolshevik  revolutionary also known as Illarion Mgeladze